The 2009 Rally d'Italia Sardegna was the sixth running of the Rally d'Italia Sardegna and the sixth round of the 2009 World Rally Championship season. The rally consisted of 17 special stages.

This year's Rally d'Italia Sardegna has new reforms of this rally, with new stages at the first day & the last day, mostly these new stages are gravel with some section of tarmac that make it difficult for drivers especially the grip of the tyres.

Finns Jari-Matti Latvala and Mikko Hirvonen took a double win for the Ford factory team.
Latvala's win was his career second, after becoming the youngest-ever driver to win a world rally at the 2008 Swedish Rally. Norwegian privateer Petter Solberg took the final podium spot.

Summary
Several front-runners ran into problems on stage eleven. Citroën's defending world champion Sébastien Loeb lost over a minute and dropped from third to fourth due to a puncture. His fifth-placed teammate Dani Sordo lost even more time and positions with a turbo problem. Eighth-placed Stobart driver Henning Solberg's day ended after he went off the road and broke his Ford Focus WRC's right-hand front suspension, and Citroën Junior Team's Conrad Rautenbach retired after the stage from tenth place with a damper failure. The rally leader Jari-Matti Latvala of Ford also spun during the stage, but escaped without damage.

Latvala led the event from start to finish, taking Ford's first win since the one-two at the 2008 Rally Japan. His teammate Mikko Hirvonen was less than ten seconds behind after two days and supposed to benefit from running behind Latvala on the road, but dust clouds and the resulting hampered visibility suddenly forced him to settle for second. Ford boss Malcolm Wilson decided against applying team orders. Loeb, whose record-equaling six win streak came to an end, took the third place back by passing Petter Solberg, but was later given a two-minute penalty for a safety rule violation; co-driver Daniel Elena unfastened his safety belts before the crew stopped the car for a tire change (after the puncture on SS11). Loeb escaped a disqualification as the stewards considered the infringement less severe because it had happened while they were not driving at a competitive pace.

Citroën Junior Team's 18-year-old Evgeny Novikov finished fifth, taking his career first points-finish. Stobart's Matthew Wilson took sixth place despite hydraulic problems that slowed him down on day one. After Khalid al-Qassimi had run into several problems while heading for career-best seventh place, the battle for the position was between two Norwegians who had had troublesome rallies, both losing about ten minutes and re-joining the event under SupeRally rules. Henning Solberg chased down Mads Østberg throughout the last day but only got within 0.6 seconds. Nasser Al-Attiyah edged out Patrik Sandell on the last stage to take the honours in the Production World Rally Championship, while the win in the Junior World Rally Championship went to Martin Prokop.

Results

Special stages

Championship standings after the event

Drivers' championship

Manufacturers' championship

References

External links 
 Official site

Sardegna
Rally Italia Sardegna
Rally Sardegna